Soviet art is a form of visual art  produced after the October Socialist Revolution of 1917 in Soviet Russia (1917—1922) and the Soviet Union (1922—1991), when the short-lived Russian Republic was overthrown and replaced. This led to an  artistic and cultural shift within Russia and the Soviet Union as a whole, including a new focus on Socialist Realism in officially approved art.

Soviet art of the post-revolutionary period

The consolidation of Soviet art was preceded throughout the 1920s by an era of intense ideological competition between different artistic groupings, with members each striving to ensure their own views would have priority in determining the forms and directions in which Soviet art would develop; seeking to occupy key posts in cultural institutions and to win the favor and support of the authorities.

This struggle was made even more bitter by the growing crisis of radical leftist art. At the turn of the 1930s, many avant-garde tendencies that had appeared back in the 1910s had exhausted themselves, and their former proponents began depicting real-life objects as they attempted to return to the traditional system of painted images. That is what occurred with the leading Jack of Diamonds artists. In the early 1930s Kazimir Malevich (1879-1935) returned to figurative art.

Prominent supporters of leftist views included David Shterenberg (1881-1948; head of the Fine Arts department of the People's Commissariat for Education (Narkompros); before the revolution a member of the Jewish Labour Bund, who lived in exile in France, where he became acquainted with Anatoli Lunacharsky), Alexander Drevin, Vladimir Tatlin, Wassily Kandinsky, Kazimir Malevich, Osip Brik, Sofya Dymshits-Tolstaya, Olga Rozanova, Mikhail Matyushin and Nathan Altman. They formed a fairly powerful group that initially determined the policy of the Fine Arts department within the Soviet government and also of the local Moscow and Petrograd Soviets.

The position of the Fine Arts department was most fully expressed by Nikolay Punin in 1919. He wrote: «If the depiction of the world does aid cognition, then only at the very earliest stages of human development, after which it already becomes either a direct hindrance to the growth of art or a class-based interpretation of it», and: «The element of depiction is already an element characteristic of a bourgeois understanding of art».

The danger of a break with the traditions of progressive pre-revolutionary art and the art school was being pointed out - chiefly by representatives of Russian art who had begun their careers back before the revolution and who, in contrast to the leftists, initially boycotted the new regime. These included Dmitry Kardovsky, Isaak Brodsky, Alexander Savinov, Abram Arkhipov, Boris Kustodiev, Kuzma Petrov-Vodkin, Arkady Rylov, Anna Ostroumova-Lebedeva, Mikhail Avilov, Alexander Samokhvalov, Boris Ioganson, Rudolf Frentz and others. The formation of these two camps, whose members held positions that were to a large extent diametrically opposed, put a distinctive stamp on the development of art and art education in the 1920s. In this atmosphere of incessant polemics and a contest between various artistic tendencies, Soviet art, and its art school came into being.

Another post-revolution movement aimed to put all arts to the service of the dictatorship of the proletariat. The instrument for this, formed just days before the October Revolution, was Proletkult, an abbreviation for "Proletarskie kulturno-prosvetitelnye organizatsii" (Proletarian Cultural and Enlightenment Organizations). A prominent theorist of this movement was Aleksandr Bogdanov (1873-1928). Initially the Narkompros (ministry of education), which was also in charge of the arts, supported Proletkult. However, the latter sought too much independence from the ruling Communist Party of Bolsheviks, came into disfavour with Vladimir Lenin, by 1922 declined considerably, and was eventually disbanded in 1932.

The ideas of Proletkult attracted the interests of Russian avantgarde, who strove to get rid of the conventions of "bourgeois art". Notable members of this movement included Vladimir Tatlin (1885-1953), Mikhail Matyushin (1861-1934), and Kazimir Malevich (who served as the director of the Petrograd State Institute of Artistic Culture (GinKHuk) from 1923 until it closed in 1926). However, the ideas of the avant-garde eventually clashed with the newly emerged state-sponsored direction of socialist realism.

In search of new forms of expression, the Proletkult organisation was highly eclectic in its art forms, and thus was prone to harsh criticism for the inclusion of such modern directions as impressionism and cubism, since these movements had existed before the revolution and hence were associated with "decadent bourgeois art".

Among the early experiments of Proletkult was the pragmatic aesthetic of industrial art, the prominent theorist being Boris Arvatov (1896-1940).

Another group was UNOVIS, a very short-lived but influential collection of young artists led by Kasimir Malevich in the 1920s.

After the discovery of porcelain in 1917 in the State Porcelain Manufactory, it was also used for propaganda purposes. This porcelain was intended less for everyday use and more for decoration. As early as the 1920s there were exhibitions of porcelain outside the Soviet Union.

Art of Socialist Realism

Officially approved art was required to follow the doctrine of Socialist Realism. In the spring of 1932, the Central Committee of the Communist Party decreed that all existing literary and artistic groups and organizations should be disbanded and replaced with unified associations of creative professions. Accordingly, the Moscow and Leningrad Union of Artists was established in August 1932, which brought the history of post-revolutionary art to a close. The epoch of Soviet art began.

In October 1932, the All-Russian Central Executive Committee and the Council of People's Commissars adopted a resolution on the creation of an Academy of Arts. The Leningrad Institute of Proletarian Fine Art was transformed into the Institute of Painting, Sculpture, and Architecture. This drew a line under a 15-year period of constant change at the country's largest institution for art education. In total, over the period 1917-1991, the Institute graduated more than 10,000 artists and art historians. Among them were such major artists and sculptors of the USSR as Alexander Samokhvalov, Yevsey Moiseyenko, Andrei Mylnikov, Yuri Neprintsev, Aleksandr Laktionov, Mikhail Anikushin, Piotr Belousov, Boris Ugarov, Ilya Glazunov, Nikolai Timkov and others.

The most known Soviet artists were Isaak Brodsky, Alexander Samokhvalov, Boris Ioganson, Aleksandr Deyneka, Aleksandr Laktionov, Yuri Neprintsev and other painters from Moscow and Leningrad School. Moscow artist Aleksandr Gerasimov produced a large number of heroic paintings of Joseph Stalin and other members of the Politburo during his career. Nikita Khrushchev later alleged that Kliment Voroshilov spent more time posing in Gerasimov's studio than he did attending to his duties in the People's Commissariat of Defense. Gerasimov's painting shows a mastery of classical representational techniques.

However, art exhibitions of 1935–1960 disprove the claims that the artistic life of the period was suppressed by the ideology and artists submitted entirely to what was then called «social order». A great number of landscapes, portraits, genre paintings, and studies exhibited at the time pursued purely technical purposes and were thus free from any ideology. That approach was also pursued ever more consistently in the genre paintings as well, although young artists at the time still lacked the experience and professional mastery to produce works of high art level devoted to Soviet actuality.

Known Russian art historian Vitaly Manin considered that «What in our time is termed a myth in the works of artists of the 1930s was a reality, one, moreover, that was perceived that way by real people. Another side of life did exist, of course, but that does not annul that the artists depicted. ... One gets the impression that disputes about art were conducted before and after 1937 in the interests of the party bureaucracy and of artists with a proletarian obsession, but not at all of true artists, who found themes in the contemporary world and did not get embroiled in questions of the form of their expression».

In the period between the mid-1950s and 1960s, the Art of Socialist realism was approaching its apex. Artists who had graduated from the Academy (Repin Institute of Arts) in the 1930s–50s were in their prime. They were quick to present their art, they strived for experiments and were eager to appropriate a lot and to learn even more. Their time and contemporaries, with all its images, ideas and dispositions found it full expression in portraits by Lev Russov, Victor Oreshnikov, Boris Korneev, Semion Rotnitsky, Vladimir Gorb, Engels Kozlov, landscapes by Nikolai Timkov, Alexander Grigoriev, Aleksei Gritsai, Vladimir Ovchinnikov, Vecheslav Zagonek, Sergei Osipov, Alexander Semionov, Arseny Semionov, Nikolai Galakhov, genre paintings by Geliy Korzhev, Arkady Plastov, Nikolai Pozdneev, Yuri Neprintsev, Fyodor Reshetnikov, Yevsey Moiseyenko, Andrei Mylnikov. Art of this period showed extraordinary taste for life and creative work.

In 1957, the first All-Union Congress of Soviet Artists takes place in Moscow. It establishes the USSR Union of Artists that unites over 13000 professional artists from all republics and of all specializations. In 1960, the Union of Artists of Russian Federation was organized. Accordingly, these events influenced the art life in Moscow, Leningrad and province. The scope of experimentation was broadened; in particular, this concerned the form and painterly and plastic language. Images of youths and students, rapidly changing villages and cities, virgin lands brought under cultivation, grandiose construction plans being realized in Siberia and the Volga region, great achievements of Soviet science and technology became the chief topics of the new painting. Heroes of the time – young scientists, workers, civil engineers, physicians – become the most popular heroes of paintings.

At this period, life provided artists with plenty of thrilling topics, positive figures and images. The legacies of many great artists and art movements again became available for study and public discussions. This greatly broadened artists’ understanding of the realist method and widened its possibilities. It was the repeated renewal of the very conception of realism that made this style dominates in the Russian art throughout its history. Realist tradition gave rise to many trends of contemporary painting, including painting from nature, «severe style» painting and decorative art. However, during this period impressionism, postimpressionism, cubism and expressionism also had their fervent adherents and interpreters.

Soviet Nonconformist Art

The death of Joseph Stalin in 1953, and Nikita Khrushchev's Thaw, paved the way for a wave of liberalization in the arts throughout the Soviet Union.  Although no official change in policy took place, artists began to feel free to experiment in their work, with considerably less fear of repercussions than during the Stalinist period.

In the 1950s Moscow artist Ely Bielutin encouraged his students to experiment with abstractionism, a practice thoroughly discouraged by the Artists' Union, which strictly enforced the official policy of Socialist Realism. Artists who chose to paint in alternative styles had to do so completely in private and were never able to exhibit or sell their work. As a result, Nonconformist Art developed along a separate path than the Official Art that was recorded in the history books.

Life magazine published two portraits by two painters, who to their mind, were most representative of Russian Arts of the period: it was Serov, an official Soviet icon and Anatoly Zverev, an underground Russian avant-garde expressionist.  Serov's portrait of Vladimir Lenin and Zverev's self-portrait were associated by many with an eternal Biblical struggle of Satan and Saviour.  When Khrushchev learned about the publication he was outraged and forbade all contacts with Western visitors, closed down all semi-legal exhibitions. Zverev was the main target of his outrage.

The Lianozovo Group was formed around the artist Oscar Rabin in the 1960s and included artists such as Valentina Kropivnitskaya, Vladimir Nemukhin, and Lydia Masterkova.  While not adhering to any common style, these artists sought to faithfully express themselves in the mode they deemed appropriate, rather than adhere to the propagandistic style of Socialist Realism.

Tolerance of Nonconformist Art by the authorities underwent an ebb and flow until the ultimate collapse of the Soviet Union in 1991. Artists took advantage of the first few years after the death of Stalin to experiment in their work without the fear of persecution. In 1962, artists experienced a slight setback when Nikita Khrushchev appeared at the exhibition of the 30th anniversary of the Moscow Artist's Union at the Moscow Manege exhibition hall, an episode known as the Manege Affair.  Among the customary works of Socialist Realism were a few abstract works by artists such as Ernst Neizvestny and Eli Beliutin, which Khrushchev criticized as being "shit," and the artists for being "homosexuals". The message was clear: artistic policy was not as liberal as everyone had hoped.

The history of late Soviet art has been dominated by politics and simplistic formulae. Both within the art world and the general public, very little consideration has been given to the aesthetic character of the work produced in the USSR in the 1970s and 1980s. Instead, the official and unofficial art of the period usually stood in for either "bad" or "good" political developments. A more nuanced picture would emphasize that there were numerous competing groups making art in Moscow and Leningrad throughout this period. The most important figures for the international art scene have been the Moscow artists Ilya Kabakov, Erik Bulatov, Andrei Monastyrsky, Vitaly Komar and Aleksandr Melamid.

The most infamous incident regarding nonconformist artists in the former Soviet Union was the 1974 Bulldozer Exhibition, which took place in a park just outside Moscow, and included work by such artists as Oscar Rabin, Komar and Melamid, Alexandr Zhdanov, Nikolai Smoliakov and Leonid Sokov . The artists involved had written to the authorities for permission to hold the exhibition but received no answer to their request. They decided to go ahead with the exhibition anyway, which consisted solely of unofficial works of art that did not fit into the rubric of Socialist Realism. The KGB put an end to the exhibition just hours after it opened by bringing in bulldozers to completely destroy all of the artworks present. However, the foreign press had been there to witness the event, and the worldwide coverage of it forced the authorities to permit an exhibition of Nonconformist Art two weeks later in Izmailovsky Park in Moscow.

A few West European collectors supported many of the artists in the Soviet Union during the 60s and 70s. One of the leading collectors and philanthropists were the couple Kenda and Jacob Bar-Gera. The Bar-Gera Collection consists of some 200 works of 59 Soviet Russian artists of who did not want to embrace the official art directive of the post-Stalinist Soviet Union. Kenda and Jacob Bar-Gera, both are survivors of the holocaust, supported these partially persecuted artists by sending them money or painting material from Germany to the Soviet Union. Even though Kenda and Jacob did not meet the artists in person, they bought many of their paintings and other art objects. The works were smuggled to Germany by hiding them in the suitcases of diplomats, travelling businessmen, and students, thus making the Bar-Gera Collection of Russian Non-Conformists among the largest of its kind in the world. Among others, the collection contains works of Bachtschanjan Vagritsch, Jankilevskij Wladimir, Rabin Oskar, Batschurin Ewganij, Kabakov Ilja, Schablavin Sergei, Belenok Piotr, Krasnopevcev Dimitrij, Schdanov Alexander, Igor Novikov, Bitt Galina, Kropivnitzkaja Walentina, Schemjakin Michail, Bobrowskaja Olga, Kropivnitzkij Lew, Schwarzman Michail, Borisov Leonid, Kropiwnizkij Jewgenij, Sidur Vadim, Bruskin Grischa, Kulakov Michail, Sitnikov  Wasili, and many others.

By the end of the 1980s, Mikhail Gorbachev's policies of Perestroika and Glasnost made it virtually impossible for the authorities to place restrictions on artists or their freedom of expression. With the collapse of the Soviet Union, the new market economy enabled the development of a gallery system, which meant that artists no longer had to be employed by the state, and could create work according to their own tastes, as well as the tastes of their private patrons.  Consequently, after around 1986 the phenomenon of Nonconformist Art in the Soviet Union ceased to exist.

See also

 Fine Art of Leningrad
 Leningrad School of Painting
 List of Russian artists
 List of painters of Saint Petersburg Union of Artists
 List of the Russian Landscape painters
 Soviet fashion design

Footnotes

Further reading

 Directory of members of the Union of Artists of USSR. Volume 1,2. - Moscow: Soviet artist, 1979.
 Lynn Mally. Culture of the Future: The Proletkult Movement in Revolutionary Russia. Berkeley:  University of California Press, 1990.
 Norton Dodge, Alla Rosenfeld, eds.  From Gulag to Glasnost: Nonconformist Art from the Soviet Union. New York: Thames and Hudson, 1995.
 George Costakis Collection. Russian Avant-Garde Art. New York: Harry N. Abrams.
 Matthew C. Bown. Dictionary of 20th Century Russian and Soviet Painters 1900-1980s. – London: Izomar 1998. 
 Vern G. Swanson. Soviet Impressionism. Woodbridge, England: Antique Collectors' Club, 2001.
 Time for change. The Art of 1960–1985 in the Soviet Union / Almanac. Vol. 140. St Petersburg, State Russian Museum, 2006.
 * Anniversary Directory graduates of Saint Petersburg State Academic Institute of Painting, Sculpture, and Architecture named after Ilya Repin, Russian Academy of Arts. 1915 - 2005. - St Petersburg: Pervotsvet Publishing, 2007. 
 Vern G. Swanson. Soviet Impressionist Painting. Woodbridge, England, Antique Collectors' Club, 2008. 
 Манин В. С. Искусство и власть. Борьба течений в советском изобразительном искусстве 1917-1941 годов. СПб: Аврора, 2008.

Gallery

External links 

 Decree of the Council of People's Commissars «On the monuments of the republic» on April 12, 1918
 Memory pages: reference and memorial collection. Artists of the Leningrad Union of Soviet Artists who died during the Great Patriotic War and in the siege of Leningrad. 1941–1945 (Rus)
 Memory pages: reference and biographical collection. Artists of the St. Petersburg (Leningrad) Union of Artists – veterans of the Great Patriotic War. 1941–1945. Book 1 (А-Л, Rus)
 Memory pages: reference and biographical collection. Artists of the St. Petersburg (Leningrad) Union of Artists – veterans of the Great Patriotic War. 1941–1945. Book 2 (М-Я, Rus)

 
Art by country
Soviet painters
Socialist realist artists
Russian painters
Art history
Art movements
Realism (art movement)